Ronald Barry Egloff (born October 3, 1955) is a former American football tight end, who played eight seasons in the National Football League (NFL) for the Denver Broncos and San Diego Chargers. He started his sports career at Plymouth-Salem High School in Plymouth, Michigan. Egloff played and received his varsity letters for football and basketball from 1970-73. He was not recruited by a major university, so he was a "walk-on" and played college football at the University of Wisconsin–Madison. He went undrafted in the 1977 NFL draft, and visited several teams before landing a try-out with the Denver Broncos. For his rookie year, 1977-78, the Broncos won their first AFC Championship and went to Super Bowl XII in New Orleans against the Dallas Cowboys and lost, 27-10. After football, he was a partner in the restaurant Jackson Hole Sports Grill for twenty years. Ron is married to his wife Julee.  They have three children: Dayton, Adam, and Elliott.

1955 births
Living people
Players of American football from Michigan
American football tight ends
Wisconsin Badgers football players
Denver Broncos players
San Diego Chargers players